This is a list of musical groups or organizations as well as musicians from the American state of Mississippi.

Musical groups or organizations

 3 Doors Down – rock band (Escatawpa)
 Bass Drum of Death – garage / punk rock band (Oxford)
 Beanland – jam band (Oxford)
 The Blackwood Brothers – gospel singers (Choctaw County)
 Blind Melon – alternative rock and jam band (Starkville)
 Blue Mountain – alternative country band (Oxford)
 Cadillac Don & J-Money – rap duo (Crawford)
 The Chambers Brothers – soul music group (Lee County)
 Colour Revolt – indie rock band (Oxford)
 David and the Giants – Christian rock band (Laurel)
 Rae Sremmurd – hip hop group (Tupelo)
 The Cook Family Singers – Christian country music group (Pascagoula)
 The Cooters – punk metal band (Oxford)
 Five Blind Boys of Mississippi – gospel singers (Piney Woods)
 Joe Frank and the Knights – garage rock band (Leland)
 Jonezetta - rock band (Clinton)
 Kudzu Kings – alternative country music band (Oxford)
 Mississippi Mass Choir – gospel choir (Jackson)
 North Mississippi Allstars – blues-rock, jam band (Hernando)
 Saving Abel – rock band (Corinth)
 The Da Vincis - electro lounge-pop group from Jackson, Mississippi
 Wavorly – Christian rock band (Tupelo)
 The Weeks – indie rock band (Florence)
 Watership Down – alternative metal band (Ocean Springs)
 Young Buffalo – indie rock band (Oxford)

Musicians

A–C

 John Luther Adams (born 1953) – composer of music inspired by nature (Meridian)
 Afroman (born 1974) – comedy rapper (Hattiesburg)
 Tommy Aldridge (born 1950) – drummer for Ozzy Osbourne and Whitesnake (Pearl)
 Mose Allison (1927–2016) – jazz musician (Tallahatchie County)
 Charlie Allen (1908–1972) – (Jackson)
 Robert Anderson (1919–1995) – gospel singer-composer and pianist (Anguilla)
 Steve Azar (born 1964) – country singer (Greenville)
 Milton Babbitt (1916–2011) – composer, electronic music pioneer (Jackson)
 Glen Ballard (born 1953) – songwriter and record producer (Natchez)
 David Banner (born 1973) – rapper and producer (Brookhaven)
 Matt Barlow (born 1970) – lead singer of the metal band Iced Earth (Biloxi)
 Prentiss Barnes (1925–2006) – rhythm and blues singer (Magnolia)
 Lance Bass (born 1979) – member of pop group 'N Sync (Laurel)
 Jeff Bates (born 1963) – country music singer-songwriter (Bunker Hill)
 Robert Belfour (1940–2015) – blues musician (Holly Springs)
 Carey Bell (1936–2007) – Chicago blues harmonica player (Macon)
 Big Time Sarah (1953-2015) – blues singer (Coldwater)
 James Blackwood (1919–2002) – one of The Blackwood Brothers (Choctaw County)
 Blind Mississippi Morris (born 1955) – blues artist (Clarksdale)
 Lucille Bogan (1897–1948) – blues singer (Amory)
 Charley Booker (1925–1989) – blues singer and guitarist (Moorhead)
 Eddie Boyd (1914–1994) – blues musician (Clarksdale)
 Bobby Bradford (born 1934) – jazz musician and composer (Cleveland)
 Jan Bradley (born 1943) – soul singer (Byhalia)
 Delaney Bramlett (1939–2008) – singer-songwriter (Pontotoc)
 Cory Branan (born 1975) – singer-songwriter (Southaven)
 Jackie Brenston (1930–1979) – American R&B singer and saxophonist (Clarksdale)
 Big Bill Broonzy (1898–1958) – blues singer-songwriter and guitarist (Scott)
 Eddie "Bongo" Brown (1932–1984) – percussionist (Clarksdale)
 Willie Brown (1900–1952) – delta blues guitarist and singer (Clarksdale)
 Jimmy Buffett (born 1946) – multi-genre singer-songwriter (Pascagoula)
 R. L. Burnside (1926–2005) – blues singer-songwriter (Harmontown)
 Jerry Butler (born 1939) – soul singer-songwriter (Sunflower)
 G. C. Cameron (born 1945) – soul and R&B singer (Jackson)
 Ace Cannon (1934–2018) – tenor and alto saxophonist (Grenada)
 Gus Cannon (1883–1979) – jug band musician (Red Banks)
 James Carr (1942–2001) - soul singer (Coahoma)
 Bo Carter (1893–1964) – blues singer (Bolton)
 Johnny Carver (born 1940) – country singer (Jackson)
 Sam Chatmon (1897–1983) – blues singer; brother of Bo Carter (Bolton)
 Otis Clay (1942–2016) – R&B and soul musician (Waxhaw)
 Chalmers Clifton (1889–1966) – conductor and composer (Jackson)
 Odia Coates (1942–1991) – singer (Vicksburg)
 Hank Cochran (1935–2010) – country music singer-songwriter (Isola)
 Bill Coday (1942–2008) – singer (Coldwater)
 Phil Cohran (1927–2017) – jazz musician (Oxford)
 Mike Compton (born 1956) – bluegrass mandolin player (Meridian)
 David L. Cook (born 1968) – multi-genre singer-songwriter-comedian (Pascagoula)
 Sam Cooke (1931–1964) – gospel, R&B, soul, and pop singer (Clarksdale)
 James Cotton (1935–2017) – blues harmonica player and singer-songwriter (Tunica)
 Arthur "Big Boy" Crudup (1905–1974) – Delta blues singer and guitarist (Forest)
 George Cummings (born 1938) – guitarist and songwriter (Meridian)

D–G

 Olu Dara (born 1941) – jazz musician (Natchez)
 Lester Davenport (1932–2009) – American blues harmonica player and singer (Tchula)
 Paul Davis (1948–2008) – singer-songwriter (Meridian)
 Jimmy Dawkins (1936–2013) – blues guitarist and singer (Tchula)
 Al Denson (born 1960) – contemporary Christian artist (Starkville)
 Bo Diddley (1928–2008) – rock & roll/R&B singer-songwriter (McComb)
 Diplo (born 1978) – electronic dance music DJ and producer (Tupelo)
 Willie Dixon (1915–1992) – blues bassist, singer-songwriter record producer (Vicksburg)
 Nate Dogg (1969–2011) – West Coast hip hop and R&B artist (Clarksdale)
 Marshall Drew (born 1984) – folk rock singer-songwriter (Clarksdale)
 Kevin Dukes (born 1956) – guitarist (Brookhaven)
 Judy Dunaway (born 1964) – avant-garde composer, free improvisor, conceptual sound artist
 Omar Kent Dykes (born 1950) – blues guitarist and singer (McComb)
 Meredith Edwards (born 1984) – country singer (Clinton)
 Ruby Elzy (1908–1943) – opera singer (Pontotoc)
 Bobby T. Enlow (1936-2019)- guitarist singer songwriter (Foxworth, Mississippi)
 Lehman Engel (1910–1982) – composer and conductor (Jackson)
 Chris Ethridge (1947–2012) – country rock musician, songwriter (Meridian)
 Shelly Fairchild (born 1977) – country music artist (Clinton)
 Nancy Plummer Faxon (1914-2005) – organist and composer (Jackson)
 Charlie Feathers (1932–1998) – (Holly Springs)
 Steve Forbert (born 1954) – pop music singer-songwriter (Meridian)
 Barbara Siggers Franklin (1917–1952) – gospel singer; mother of Aretha Franklin (Shelby)
 Lee Garrett – R&B singer-songwriter
 Eric "Red Mouth" Gebhardt – multi-genre singer-songwriter (Biloxi)
 Bobbie Gentry (born 1944) – singer-songwriter (Greenwood)
 Mickey Gilley (born 1936) – country singer and musician (Natchez)
 Mark Gray (1952–2016) – country music singer and keyboardist (Vicksburg)
 Garland Green (born 1942) – soul singer and pianist (Dunleith)
 Lloyd Green (born 1937) – country music steel guitarist (Leaf)
 Elizabeth Greenfield (c. 1820–1876) – concert singer; known as "The Black Swan"; born in slavery in Natchez
 Al Goodman (1943–2010) – R&B/soul singer (Jackson)

H–K

Owen Hale (born 1948) - drummer (Hattiesburg) 
Ted Hawkins 1936–1995) – singer-songwriter (Biloxi)
 Jessie Mae Hemphill (1923–2006) – blues musician (Como)
 Michael Henderson (born 1951) – bass guitarist, R&B singer (Yazoo City)
 Caroline Herring – bluegrass musician (Canton)
 Faith Hill (born 1967) – country/pop singer (Star)
 Kim Hill (born 1963) – Christian singer-songwriter (Starkville)
 King Solomon Hill (1897-1949) – blues musician (McComb)
 Ernie Hines (born 1938) – soul musician
 Milt Hinton (1910–2000) – jazz double bassist (Vicksburg) 
 Eddie Hodges (born 1947) – actor, singer, producer (Hattiesburg)
 John Lee Hooker (1917–2001) – singer-songwriter and blues guitarist (Clarksdale)
 Big Walter Horton (1917–1981) – blues harmonica player (Horn Lake)
 Son House (1902–1988) – blues singer and guitarist (Riverton)
 Randy Houser (born 1975) – country music artist (Lake)
 Thelma Houston (born 1943) – R&B singer-songwriter (Leland)
 Guy Hovis (born 1941) – big band singer (Tupelo)
 Howlin' Wolf (1910–1976) – blues singer, guitarist, harmonica player (West Point)
 Cary Hudson – lead singer and guitarist for alternative country band Blue Mountain (Sumrall)
 Mississippi John Hurt (c. 1893–1966) – country blues singer and guitarist (Teoc)
 Clifton Hyde (born 1976) – multi-instrumentalist and producer (Hattiesburg)
 Carl Jackson (born 1953) – country and bluegrass musician (Louisville)
 Cordell Jackson (1923–2004) – rockabilly guitarist, producer (Pontotoc)
 George Jackson (1945–2013) – blues and soul singer (Indianola)
 Elmore James (1918–1963) – blues guitarist and singer-songwriter (Richland)
 Skip James (1902–1969) – Delta blues guitarist, pianist, singer-songwriter (Bentonia)
 Jimi Jamison (1951–2014) – singer-songwriter (Durant, Mississippi)
 Roosevelt Jamison (1936–2013) – songwriter, publicist (Olive Branch)
 Jai Johanny "Jaimoe" Johanson (born 1944) – drummer in The Allman Brothers Band (Ocean Springs)
 Big Jack Johnson (1940–2011) – blues musician (Clarksdale)
 Jimmy Johnson (born 1928) – blues guitarist and singer (Holly Springs)
 Robert Johnson (1911–1938) – blues and Delta blues musician (Hazlehurst)
 Syl Johnson (1936–2022) – blues and soul singer (Holly Springs)
 Margie Joseph (born 1950) – R&B and soul singer (Pascagoula)
 Junior Kimbrough (1930–1998) – blues artist (Hudsonville)
 Albert King (1923–1992) – blues guitarist and singer (Indianola)
 B. B. King (1925–2015) – blues guitarist and singer-songwriter (Indianola)
 Little Freddie King (born 1940, aka Fread Eugene Martin) – Delta blues guitarist (McComb)
 Fern Kinney – rhythm & blues and disco music entertainer (Jackson)
 J. Fred Knobloch (born 1953, aka Fred Knoblock) – country singer-songwriter (Jackson)
 Big K.R.I.T. (born 1986) – hip-hop artist (Meridian)

L–M

 Skylar Laine (born 1994) – country music singer; finalist American Idol (Brandon)
 Sonny Landreth (born 1951) – blues musician and slide guitar player (Canton)
 Denise LaSalle (1934–2018) – blues and contemporary R&B singer-songwriter, record producer (Belzoni)
 Rick Lawson (born 1973) – soul and R&B singer (Raymond)
 Chris LeDoux (1948–2005) – country music singer-songwriter (Biloxi)
 Floyd Lee (1933–2020) – blues musician and founding member of Music Under New York (Lamar)
 Swae Lee (born 1993) – hip hop singer 
 Mylon LeFevre (born 1944) – gospel and Christian rock singer (Gulfport)
 J. B. Lenoir (1929–1967) – guitarist and singer-songwriter (Monticello)
 Robert "Squirrel" Lester (1942–2010) – second tenor of The Chi-Lites (McComb)
 Bobby Lounge (born 1950) – singer-songwriter (McComb)
 Dent May – musician (Jackson)
 La'Porsha Renae Mays – musician (McComb)
 Tommy McClennan (1908–c. 1962) – Delta blues singer and guitarist (Yazoo City)
 George McConnell – guitarist (Vicksburg)
 Kansas Joe McCoy (1905–1950) – blues musician and songwriter (Raymond)
 Papa Charlie McCoy (1909–1950) – Delta blues musician and songwriter (Jackson)
 Mississippi Fred McDowell (1904–1972) – Delta blues musician and songwriter (Born in Rossville, Tennessee, resided in  Como)
 Scott McQuaig (1959) – country music singer and songwriter (Meridian)
 Mulgrew Miller (1955–2013) – jazz pianist (Greenwood)
 Little Milton (1934–2005) – blues and soul vocalist and guitarist (Inverness)
 Mississippi Slim (1923–1973) – country singer and guitarist (Smithville)
 Monkey Joe – blues musician (Jackson)
 Dorothy Moore (born 1947) – pop, R&B, gospel singer (Jackson)
 Johnny B. Moore (born 1950) – blues singer and guitarist (Clarksdale)
 Jasmine Murray (born 1992) – singer and beauty pageant titleholder; finalist, 8th season, American Idol (2009) television singing-competition series (Columbus/Starkville)
 Charlie Musselwhite (born 1944) – blues-harp player and bandleader (Kosciusko)
 Sam Myers (1936–2006) - blues musician, harmonica player, and songwriter (Laurel)
 Bill Myrick (1926–2011) – country singer-songwriter, musician, producer, disc jockey (Simpson County)

N–S

 Brandy Norwood (born 1979) – R&B singer-songwriter/record producer (McComb)
 Willie Norwood (born 1955) – gospel singer (McComb)
 Maty Noyes (born 1997) – pop singer (Corinth)
 Alexander O'Neal (born 1953) – soul singer (Natchez)
 Paul Overstreet (born 1955) – country music singer-songwriter (Vancleave)
 Ginny Owens – contemporary Christian music singer-songwriter (Jackson)
 Junior Parker (1932–1971) – Memphis blues singer and musician (Clarksdale)
 Michael Passons (born 1965) – founding member of the Christian band Avalon (Yazoo City)
 Charlie Patton (1891–1934) – Delta-/Country-/Gospel blues musician (Edwards)
 Dion Payton (1950–2021) – blues guitarist and singer (Greenwood)
 Robert Powell (born 1932) – composer, organist, choir director (Benoit)
 Elvis Presley (1935–1977) – multi-genre musician (Tupelo)
 Leontyne Price (born 1927) – opera singer (Laurel)
 Charley Pride (1934–2020) – country music singer (Sledge)
 John Primer (born 1945) – blues singer and guitarist (Camden)
 Ray J (born 1981) – contemporary R&B and hip hop singer/record producer (McComb)
 Jimmy Reed (1925–1976) – blues singer and musician (Dunleith)
 Del Rendon (1965–2005) – singer/songwriter (Starkville)
 Mack Rice (1933–2016) – songwriter (Clarksdale)
 LeAnn Rimes (born 1982) – country and pop singer (Pearl)
 Fenton Robinson (1935–1997) – blues musician (Greenwood)
 Jimmie Rodgers (1897–1933) – country singer (Meridian)
 Jimmy Rogers (1924–1997) – blues singer and guitarist (Ruleville)
 David Ruffin (1941–1991) – former lead singer of The Temptations (Whynot)
 Jimmy Ruffin (1939–2014) – soul and R&B singer (Collinsville)
 Bobby Rush (born 1940) – blues and R&B musician, composer, singer,(Jackson)
 Otis Rush (1935–2018) – blues musician (Philadelphia)
 Oliver Sain (1932–2003) – saxophonist, drummer, songwriter, record producer (Dundee)
 Magic Sam (1937–1969) – Chicago blues and soul blues musician (Grenada)
 Johnny Sea (1940–2016) – country singer (Gulfport)
 Toni Seawright (born 1964) – singer-songwriter (Pascagoula)
 Jumpin' Gene Simmons (1933–2006) – rockabilly singer (Tupelo)
 Byther Smith (born 1933) – blues musician (Monticello)
 Garren Isaac Smith (born 1977) - singer, songwriter, actor, music publisher (Bassfield)
 Soulja Boy (born 1990) – rapper, record producer (Batesville)
 Otis Spann (1930–1970) – blues musician (Jackson)
 Britney Spears (born 1981) – pop singer (McComb)
 Judson Spence (born 1965) – songwriter and multi-instrumentalist (Pascagoula)
 Roebuck "Pop" Staples (1914–2000) – founder of The Staple Singers (Winona)
 Rogers Stevens (born 1970) – guitarist for the band Blind Melon (West Point)
 Lisa Stewart (born 1968) – country musician (Louisville)
 William Grant Still (1895–1978) – classical composer (Woodville)
 Barrett Strong (born 1941) – singer-songwriter (West Point)
 Marty Stuart (born 1958) – country music singer (Philadelphia)
 Hubert Sumlin (1931–2011) – blues musician (Greenwood)
 Deanna Summers – songwriter

T–Z
* Ty Tabor (born 1961) – guitarist, singer-songwriter for rock band King's X (Pearl)
 Eddie Taylor (1923–1985) – blues guitarist and singer (Benoit)
 Hound Dog Taylor (1915–1975) – blues guitarist and singer (Natchez)
 Melvin Taylor (born 1959) – blues musician (Jackson)
 Ernie Terrell (1939–2014) – singer and record producer (Belzoni)
 Jean Terrell (born 1944) – R&B and jazz singer (Belzoni)
 James "Son" Thomas (1926–1993) – blues musician (Leland)
 Rufus Thomas (1917–2001) – R&B, funk, soul singer (Cayce)
 Lil' Dave Thompson (1969–2010) – blues singer and guitarist (Jackson)
 Paul Thorn (born 1964) – Southern rock, country, Americana, and blues singer-songwriter (Tupelo)
 Todd Tilghman (born 1978) gospel singer (Meridian)
 Ike Turner (1931–2007) – multi-genre musician, record producer (Clarksdale)
 Monteco (born 1978) R&B Singer
 Conway Twitty (1933–1993) – country singer-songwriter (Friars Point)
 L. C. Ulmer (1928-2016) – delta blues (Stringer) 
 Bobby V (born 1980) – singer-songwriter 
 Freddie Waits (1943–1989) – hard bop and post-bop drummer (Jackson)
 Travis Wammack (born 1944) – rock and roll guitarist (Walnut)
 Walter Ward (1940–2006) – R&B singer; lead vocalist of The Olympics (Jackson)
 Muddy Waters (1913–1983) – electric blues and Chicago blues musician (Rolling Fork)
 Jim Weatherly (1943–2021) – country and pop singer-songwriter (Pontotoc)
 Carl Weathersby (born 1953) – blues vocalist, guitarist, songwriter (Jackson)
 Boogie Bill Webb (1924–1990) – blues guitarist and singer (Jackson)
 Bukka White (1909–1977) – Delta blues guitarist and singer (Houston)
 Carson Whitsett (1945–2007) – keyboardist, arranger, and songwriter (Jackson)
 Tim Whitsett (born 1943) – band leader, songwriter, producer, publisher (Jackson)
 Webb Wilder (born 1954) – country/surf music/rock & roll musician (Hattiesburg)
 Big Joe Williams (1903–1982) – Delta blues musician and songwriter (Crawford)
 Hayley Williams (born 1988) – pop punk and alternative rock singer-songwriter (Meridian)
 Sonny Boy Williamson II (1912–1965) – blues harmonica player and singer-songwriter (Glendora)
 Eddie Willis (1936–2018) – electric guitarist (Grenada)
 Robert Wilkins (1896-1987) – blues guitarist and vocalist (Hernando)
 Al Wilson (1939–2008) – singer and drummer (Meridian)
 Cassandra Wilson (born 1955) – jazz singer-songwriter (Jackson)
 Mary Wilson (1944–2021) – singer and founding member of The Supremes (Greenville)
 Elder Roma Wilson (1910–2018) – harmonica player (Blue Springs)
 Andrew Wood (1966–1990) – singer-songwriter and front man for Seattle-area bands Malfunkshun and Mother Love Bone (Columbus)
 Nanette Workman (born 1945) – singer-songwriter, actress and author (Jackson)
 Charlie Worsham (born 1985) – country singer-songwriter (Grenada)
 Tammy Wynette (1942–1998) – country music singer-songwriter (Tremont)
 Lester Young (1909–1959) – jazz tenor saxophonist and clarinetist (Woodville)
 Zora Young (born 1948) – blues singer (West Point)

See also

 List of people from Mississippi
 Lists of musicians

References

Mississippi
Musicians